OCI may refer to:

Businesses and organizations
 OCI (company), green energy and chemical company, South Korea
 Oakwood Collegiate Institute, Toronto, Canada
 Office of Criminal Investigations of the U.S. Food and Drug Administration
 Olympic Council of Ireland, the national olympic committee of Ireland
 Ontario Cancer Institute, Canada
 Order of the Crown of Italy, Italian order
 Open Constitution Initiative, advocacy group in China
 Orascom Construction Industries, construction and fertilizer company, Egypt
 Ottawa Collegiate Institute, now Lisgar Collegiate Institute, Canada
 Organisation Communiste Internationaliste, (Internationalist Communist Organisation), former French political party
 Organisation de la Coopération Islamique, (Organisation of Islamic Cooperation), international organization

Computing
 Open Catalog Interface, an interface standard in computing
 Open Container Initiative, a Linux standards project in computing
 Oracle Call Interface, database interface software
 Oracle Cloud Infrastructure, an on demand cloud computing platform

Other uses
 oci, ISO 639-1/2 language code for Occitan language
 Online Compliance Intervention, unlawful method of automated debt assessment
 Organizational Conflict of Interest in capitalism theory
 Other comprehensive income, part of Accumulated other comprehensive income in U.S. accounting
 Overseas Citizen of India, a scheme granting a status similar to, but not the same as, dual citizenship in India

See also 
 Ocicat, a breed of cat